Gordon Eakin is an American college softball coach and the current head coach of the BYU Cougars softball team. Eakin is a graduate of the University of Utah and is a former Major League Baseball player for the Oakland Athletics. Eakin also serves as the USA National Team Hitting Coach.

Career
Eakin was hired as an assistant coach to Mark Kay Amicone in 2001. After the 2002 season Amicone decided to resign, and Eakin became the coach of BYU Softball. During his span as BYU coach, Eakin has coached the Cougars to 6 consecutive conference titles in four separate leagues. He led BYU to their first super regional appearance in 2008 and has coached 12 All-Americans. Two of Eakin's players have gone on to play professionally. Eakin has won conference coach of the year four times (2009, 2010, 2011, 2013) and has never finished lower than third in the conference. Eakin has guided BYU to top-ten national finishes in slugging percentage six times, home runs per game six times, batting average four times and scoring four times.

Division I Coaching Record
Eakin has won 6 straight conference titles, 7 of 8, and 8 of 10 since 2005. He has also won the two conference tournaments that he has had a chance to win since 2005. The MWC last held a conference tournament in 2005, and the PCSC and WCC didn't have conference tournaments.

References

Year of birth missing (living people)
Living people
American softball coaches
BYU Cougars softball coaches
United States women's national softball team coaches